Ascochinga is a town in Colón Department, in Córdoba Province, Argentina.

It is connected to the rest of the province by two paved roads, Provincial Route E53 and Provincial Route E66, plus a mountain unpaved road  in length, through the hills called Camino del Pungo, reaching La Cumbre.

From the 19th Century on it was a tourism destination for the upper class of Córdoba who owned big ranches in the area, belonging to families like Governor Cárcano, Dulce L. de Martínez de Hoz with a hotel and golf course, today a vacation resort for the Argentine Air Force and the "La Paz" ranch, owned at the time by twice President Julio Argentino Roca.

Due to the Air Force connection, it has a small airport (Ascochinga Airport )  from the town.

The area has been used as a special stage for Rally Argentina.

External links

 Geo Coord

Populated places in Córdoba Province, Argentina
Tourism in Argentina
Rally Argentina